Princess Gryzelda Konstancja Wiśniowiecka née Zamoyska of clan Jelita (27 April 1623 – 17 April 1672) was a Polish noblewoman, known as the mother of King Michał Korybut Wiśniowiecki.

Life
She was the daughter of Tomasz Zamoyski, voivode of Podole and Chancellor and Princess Katarzyna Ostrogska. Gryzelda married Prince Jeremi Michał Wiśniowiecki h. Korybut on 27 February 1639 in Zamość and had one son: Michał Korybut Wiśniowiecki, King of Poland.  She was buried on 10 June 1672 in Warsaw.

Bibliography
 Ilona Czamańska: Wiśniowieccy - monografia rodu. Poznań: Wydawnictwo Poznańskie, 2007.

References

External links 
 Discussion of the portrait 
 http://www.wilanow-palac.pl/wisniowiecka_gryzelda_konstancja.html
 http://www.jarema.art.pl/Gkw.htm

1623 births
1672 deaths
Gryzelda Konstancja
Gryzelda
17th-century Polish people